Michael John Osborne (born 9 April 1932) is an English former first-class cricketer and Royal Air Force airman.

While serving in the Royal Air Force, Osborne played first-class cricket for the Combined Services cricket team. He made his debut in 1961 against the touring South Africa Fezelas at Portsmouth. He made two further appearances in 1962, against Cambridge University at Fenner's, and Ireland at Belfast. In the match against Cambridge University, he recorded what would his only first-class half century by making 60 runs in the Combined Services first-innings. He scored 155 runs in his three matches, averaging 25.83. He also took two wickets with his off break bowling. Osborne later played minor counties cricket for Devon in 1968, making two appearances in the Minor Counties Championship.

References

External links

1932 births
Living people
Sportspeople from Southend-on-Sea
Royal Air Force airmen
English cricketers
Combined Services cricketers
Devon cricketers
20th-century Royal Air Force personnel
Military personnel from Southend-on-Sea